Vidunda (Chividunda) is a Bantu language spoken along the north bank of the Ruaha River in Tanzania. It belongs to the Ruvu branch of Northeast Coast Bantu.

References

Languages of Tanzania
Northeast Coast Bantu languages